The Lancia Dedra (Type 835) is a compact executive car produced by the Italian automaker Lancia from 1989 to 1999. It was initially designed to support, and later to replace, the Prisma that, six years after its launch, was having difficulty remaining competitive with its latest opponents. It can be considered as the saloon version of the second generation Delta, that was launched four years later, in 1993.

History
The task of the Dedra was demanding: it had to continue the legacy of the Prisma, which relaunched the Lancia brand in the field of compact executive cars, and expand its market share if possible. Larger than its predecessor, the Dedra was presented as the second flagship car of Lancia, as a car that could satisfy those looking for an elegant medium-sized sedan but did not want to buy an executive car, as the Thema.

The design, by Ercole Spada of the I.DE.A Institute, produced an excellent drag coefficient of only 0.29. The core of the product was prestige, exclusivity, personality and comfort, achieved through a high level of equipment and use of materials (e.g. Alcantara) as well as details such as special paints, alloy wheels and an attention to soundproofing, ventilation and other issues. Inside the ability to obtain the perfect driving position was helped by the adjustable seats, steering wheel and electrically adjustable mirrors. Safety, both passive with a structure designed to minimize injury in an accident, and active, such as ABS and airbag, was also near the top of the Dedra's agenda.

It was based on the Fiat Type Three platform, because the idea of Fiat Group at the end of the 80s was to achieve, from a single floorpan (for reasons of economies of scale), three different cars from the same base: elegance for Lancia Dedra 1989, convenience at a competitive price for the Fiat Tempra (1990) (with its large boot) and sportsmanship for the Alfa Romeo 155 (1992).

In 1991, the Dedra Integrale was launched. It used the same engine and transmission that the Delta Integrale 8v. The Delta Integrale 8v engine is one of the world's most competition proven power units, a 2-litre four-cylinder fuel injected twin cam engine, fitted with contra-rotating balancing shafts, and a Garrett T3 turbocharger and associated inter-cooler to aid volumetric efficiency that boost power output to 171 PS (127 kW) in catalyzed version. The Dedra Integrale also uses the same permanent four-wheel drive of the Delta Integrale, and includes the new Visco Drive 2000 traction control system. Also includes the electronically controlled suspension available as option in the 2.0 and upper versions.

When the Dedra was launched, it was a good time for Lancia: The Thema had been facelifted a year earlier, and despite being on the market for five years was selling well, the Delta (1979), thanks its continued success in competition was living a second youth, and the Y10 had a slight restyling and good sales. However, the Dedra was not a strong success outside Italy. A major facelift in 1993 did little to boost the car's sales success and the whole Lancia range including the Dedra was withdrawn from right hand drive markets a year later. The car, from 1994 also sold as a station wagon which was developed by French coachbuilders Heuliez, remained popular on the Italian market until it was replaced by the all-new Lybra in 1999. 

A total of 418,084 Dedras were manufactured during its commercial life.

Summary
January 89: Production begun
April 89: Official launch (1.6 L, 1.8 L, 2.0 L and 1.9 L tds versions).
May 91: Launch of Integrale and 2.0 L turbocharger versions.
May 92: Launch of automatic version.
October 92: First facelift.
January 93: Enhancement of security equipment.
July 94: Launch of second version, with new engines, station wagon version and other minor enhancements.
January 95: Included anti theft device.
November 95: Second facelift.
February 96: 2.0 L engine was replaced by 1.8 L 16 V.
January 97: New 2.0 L 16 V Integrale version.
May 97: New interiors.
July 97: New 1.8 L  engine.
December 97: Launch of third version, with new engines, new frontal, new door and other minor enhancements.
January 00: End of production.

Versions
The Dedra had some revisions. The first was in 1992, to adapt the engine, resizing the features and introducing the HF Integrale 180 HP version. The second was between 1994 and 1998, with the introduction of the DOHC 16V engine.

Phase one (1992)

 Dedra 1.6 ie 8V - 90 HP
 Dedra 1.6 ie cat - 76 HP
 Dedra 1.8 ie cat - 107 HP
 Dedra 2.0 ie cat - 115 HP
 Dedra 2.0 ie Automatic - 115 PS (4 gears)
 Dedra 2.0 Turbo 8v HF - 165 PS (FWD)
 Dedra 2.0 Turbo 8v HF Integrale - 180 PS
 Dedra 1.9 Turbo DS cat - 90 PS

The Dedra 2.0 Turbo 8V HF Integrale, with equip LX, had a digital panel and also had a limited slip differential, allowing better control of the car on dangerous surfaces. The Dedra HF Integrale, and Turbo, could have an optional rear wing spoiler to give a better aerodynamic at high speeds.

The Dedra 2.0 Turbo 8V HF FWD was lighter than Integrale, but even a bit lower than Integrale. Both of them had wheels 195/50 R 15.

Phase two (1994) (restyling)

 Dedra 1.6 8V MPI - 90 PS
 Dedra 1.8 16V - 108 PS
 Dedra 2.0 16V - 139 PS
 Dedra 2.0 16V Integrale - 139 PS

Three years later, the HF versions were replaced by atmospheric 16V engines.

Phase three (1996 - 1998)
 Dedra 1.8 16v 113 PS (1996). This motor was also used in Fiat Bravo.
 Dedra 1.8 16v VVT 131 PS (1996). Replaced the 2.0 16V 139 PS.
 Dedra 1.6 16v 103 PS (1998). This motor was also used in Fiat Bravo.

Reception
In October 2013, Top Gear magazine placed the Dedra on its list of "The 13 worst cars of the last 20 years.", not because of the car itself, which they consider average, but as a depiction of the loss of spirit in Lancia cars after the takeover by Fiat.

Concept cars

In 1992, IAD Studio presented its Magia prototype based on a Dedra Integrale rolling chassis. It was a four-seat coupé that was finished in bright orange and had a distinctive wedge shape that combined soft lines and aggressive details. It was designed by Michael Ani and Chris Garfield of IAD.

See also 
 Fiat SOHC engine
 Fiat Twin Cam engine

References

External links

1990 Advertisement
Lancia Dedra Review by the Automobile Association
Lancia Dedra: Retrospective 

Dedra
Mid-size cars
Compact executive cars
Sedans
Station wagons
1990s cars
Cars introduced in 1989
All-wheel-drive vehicles
Front-wheel-drive vehicles
Cars discontinued in 1999